Nine Times That Same Song is the debut studio album by Swedish indie pop group Love Is All. It was released by the independent record label What's Your Rupture? in January 2006.

Reception 

Online music magazine Pitchfork named Nine Times That Same Song the 16th best album of 2005 and placed it at number 139 on their list of the top 200 albums of the 2000s.

Track listing 
 "Talk Talk Talk Talk"  – 2:50
 "Ageing Had Never Been His Friend"  – 2:45
 "Turn the Radio Off"  – 3:55
 "Used Goods"  – 2:20
 "Busy Doing Nothing"  – 3:25
 "Make Out Fall Out Make Up"  – 3:02
 "Felt Tip"  – 4:18
 "Spinning and Scratching"  – 3:05
 "Turn the TV Off"  – 3:25
 "Trying Too Hard"  – 1:57

Notes 

2005 debut albums
Lo-fi music albums
Love Is All albums
What's Your Rupture? albums